Mount Pleasant is a historic home located near Strasburg, Shenandoah County, Virginia. It was built in 1812, and is a -story, five bay, brick Federal style dwelling. The four-bay, one-story southeastern wing, constructed of dressed-rubble limestone, was probably built about 1790. It was renovated in the 1930s and in 1979. Also on the property are the contributing brick, pyramidal-roofed smokehouse (c. 1812); a large, frame, bank barn (c. 1890–1900); a frame wagon shed/corn crib (c. 1920); a frame tenant house and garage (c. 1920); an old well, no longer in use, with a circular stone wall and gable-roofed frame superstructure (c. 1920); a substantial, brick, gable-roofed, one-story garage (c. 1930); and the original road configuration from about 1790.

It was listed on the National Register of Historic Places in 2011.

See also
 National Register of Historic Places listings in Shenandoah County, Virginia

References

External links
 

Federal architecture in Virginia
Houses completed in 1812
Houses in Shenandoah County, Virginia
Houses on the National Register of Historic Places in Virginia
National Register of Historic Places in Shenandoah County, Virginia